Events in the year 1982 in Spain.

Incumbents 
 Monarch – Juan Carlos I
 Prime Minister of Spain – Leopoldo Calvo-Sotelo (till 2 December); Felipe González (from 2 December)

Events 
12 May – Spanish priest Juan María Fernández y Krohn tries to stab Pope John Paul II with a bayonet during the latter's pilgrimage to the shrine at Fátima, Portugal. 
30 May – Spain joins NATO.
1 October – Coup d'état attempt: Home Office Secretary Juan José Rosón learns of a conspiracy to carry out a coup d'état later in the month.  The three main suspects, Artillery Colonel Luis Muñoz Gutiérrez, Artillery Colonel Jesús Crespo Cuspinera, and the latter's brother, Lieutenant Colonel José Crespo Cuspinera, are arrested the following morning.
28 October – The general election ends in victory for the Spanish Socialist Workers' Party.

Popular culture

Music
Lucía represents Spain at the Eurovision Song Contest, with the song "Él". She finishes 10th out of 18 entries.<ref>{{cite web|url=http://www.esc-history.com/details.asp?key=481|title=ESC History 1982}}</ref>

FilmSee List of Spanish films of 1982 Television 
14 February – Verano azul concludes its run on TVE1. The series, with 19 episodes that drew up to 20 million viewers in Spain, has been frequently re-run during the summer months in subsequent years.

 Literature 
Miguel Delibes – Los santos inocentesJuan Marsé – Un día volveré Sport 
20 April-9 May – 1982 Vuelta a España cycle race

 Notable births 
26 March – Mikel Arteta, football player and manager
2 April – David Ferrer, tennis player
22 June – Andoni Iraola, football player and manager
5 July – Alain Arroyo, footballer
1 October – Sergio Sánchez, long-distance runner
15 December – Borja García, racing driver

 Notable deaths 
 November 5 – Santiago Amat, Olympic sailor (born 1887)
 December 8 – Encarnación Fuyola, teacher and activist (born 1907)date unknown'' – José María Valiente Soriano, politician (born 1900)

References

External links

 
Spain
Years of the 20th century in Spain
Spain
1980s in Spain